Cryptandra exserta is a flowering plant in the family Rhamnaceae and is endemic to inland Western Australia. It is a shrub with narrowly oblong leaves and clusters of white, tube-shaped flowers.

Description
The edges of the leaves are turned down or rolled under, sometimes concealing the hairy white lower surface. The flowers are borne in spike-like clusters of 2 to 5, sometimes up to 10, on the ends of branchlets. The flowers are surrounded by about 10 broadly egg-shaped to oblong bracts. Flowering occurs from July to September.

Taxonomy and naming
Cryptandra exserta was first formally described in 2007 by Barbara Lynette Rye in the journal Nuytsia from specimens collected north of  Norseman in 2001. The specific epithet (exserta ) means "protruding", referring to the flowers' protruding from the bracts.

Distribution and habitat
This cryptandra mainly grows on plains in the Coolgardie and Mallee bioregions of inland Western Australia.

Conservation status
This cryptandra is listed as "Threatened" by the Western Australian Government Department of Biodiversity, Conservation and Attractions, meaning that it is in danger of extinction.

References

exserta
Rosales of Australia
Flora of Western Australia
Plants described in 2007
Taxa named by Barbara Lynette Rye